AL was a French automobile manufactured by L'Energie Electro-Mécanique based at Suresnes. In 1907, the company manufactured one of the first recorded hybrid cars (the Lohner–Porsche was earlier, as was the Pieper), it was a combination gas-electric vehicle that ran at 24 hp.

References

External links
  History of Automobile 1900–09

Brass Era vehicles
Hybrid electric cars
Defunct motor vehicle manufacturers of France
Hybrid electric vehicles